Owner-occupancy or home-ownership is a form of housing tenure in which a person, called the owner-occupier, owner-occupant, or home owner, owns the home in which they live. The home can be a house, such as  a single-family house, an apartment, condominium, or a housing cooperative. In addition to providing housing, owner-occupancy also functions as a real estate investment.

Acquisition 
Some homes are constructed by the owners with the intent to occupy. Many are inherited. A large number are purchased, as new homes from a real estate developer or as an existing home from a previous landlord or owner-occupier.

A house is usually the most expensive single purchase an individual or family makes, and often costs several times the annual household income. Given the high cost, most individuals do not have enough savings on hand to pay the entire amount outright. In developed countries, mortgage loans are available from financial institutions in return for interest. If the home owner fails to meet the agreed repayment schedule, a foreclosure (known as a repossession in some countries) may result.

Many countries offer aid to prospective homebuyers to make their purchases. These measures include grants, subsidized mortgages, and mortgage guarantees. Prospective homebuyers may have to meet certain qualifications to qualify for government aid, such as being a first-time homebuyer or having an income below a certain threshold.

Pros and cons 
Home ownership gives occupants the right to modify the building and land as they please (subject to government, homeowner association, and deed restrictions), protects them from eviction, and creates a right to occupation which can be inherited. In some jurisdictions, it also confers certain legal rights with regard to abutters.

Houses and the land they sit on are expensive, and the combination of monthly mortgage, insurance, maintenance and repairs, and property tax payments are sometimes greater than monthly rental costs.  Buildings may also gain and lose substantial value due to real estate market fluctuations, and selling a property can take a long time, depending on market conditions.  This can make home ownership more constraining if the homeowner intends to move at a future date. Some home owners see their purchase as an investment and intend to sell or to rent the property after renovating or letting the house appreciate in value (known as flipping if done quickly).

Compared to renters and absentee landlords, owner-occupiers are sometimes seen as more responsible toward property maintenance and community concerns, since they are more directly affected.

Traditionally, home ownership has been encouraged by governments in Western countries (especially English-speaking countries) because it was thought to help people acquire wealth, to encourage savings, and promote civic engagement. However, the housing market crash of 2008 in most of the English-speaking world has caused academic and policy-makers to question this logic.

Political influence
Owning a home influences how an individual views the role of government. Data from OECD countries shows that when housing prices rise, individuals are more critical of the welfare state. Conversely, when housing prices drop, homeowners are more likely to favor government intervention. In the US, areas with high rates of homeownership have higher levels of voter turnout. There is also a weak relationship between homeownership and supporting Republican candidates. Data from the UK supports the idea that homeowners view the value of their home as a kind of private, informal insurance policy against economic shocks. A sufficiently valuable home protects the owner without need for government intervention.

International statistics

Source: Housing Finance Information Network (HOFINET)

Costs of home ownership

Property tax
Homeowners are usually required to pay property tax (or millage tax) periodically.  The tax is levied by the governing authority of the jurisdiction in which the property is located; it may be paid to a national government, a federated state, a county or geographical region, or a municipality. Multiple jurisdictions may tax the same property.

Property Transfer Tax
In most Canadian provinces home purchasers must pay a one-time tax called a Property Transfer Tax (Land Transfer Tax) which is based on the cost of the home.

 See also 
 Home ownership in Australia
 Homeownership in the United States
 Imputed rent
 Negative equity
 Ownership
 Property
 List of countries by home ownership rate

References

Further reading
 Kwak, Nancy H. A World of Homeowners: American Power and the Politics of Housing Aid'' ( University of Chicago Press, 2015). 328 pp.

External links 
 Home Ownership Rate by U.S. State – Aggregation of Federal Reserve economic data

Ownership
Land tenure
Housing